Ozrinići is a village in the municipality of Nikšić, Montenegro.

History

The village was founded by five families of the Ozrinići tribe in 1597.  Apart from the Ozrinići descendants, from the 18th century onwards there were families that settled from Banjani, Kriči, Pješivci, and from other regions and tribes.

In March 1942, during the leftist errors of Second World War, Ozrinići were burned down by Partisans from Nikšić.

Demographics
According to the 2003 census, the town has a population of 2,024 people.

According to the 2011 census, its population was 2,057.

References

Populated places in Nikšić Municipality